Viive Sterpu (née Sirkel, December 10, 1953 – December 5, 2012) was an Estonian artist married to fellow artist Eugen Sterpu. She lived and worked in Tallinn, Estonia.

Biography
Sterpu drew mostly with pastel colours on sandpaper. She also experimented with graphic art and glass works. Sterpu found her motifs mostly from everyday life. She loved animals and nature and portrayed them in her art. Sterpu signed her art with the name '"Viive"'. Before her marriage she used name "Sirkel" as a signature. In 2004 Eesti Televisioon made a documentary Viive and Eugen Sterpu for the programme series  “Subjektiiv”. Sterpu was a member of Estonian Artists' Association.

Sterpu had individual and joint exhibitions in Estonia, Finland and Italy. In April 2012 she had a joint art exhibition with his husband in Turku, Finland. Giacomo Puccini's music gave her the inspiration to draw a series of 12 pictures called "The Puccinian Heroines". She donated this series of 14 heroines (Anna, Tigrana, Manon, Mimi/Musetta, Tosca, Cio-Cio-San, Minnie, Magda, Giorgetta, Suor Angeliga, Lauretta, Liú/Turandot) to the Villa Museo Giacomo Puccini (Torre del Lago Puccini in Italy) in April 2007. The donation was received by Signora Simonetta Puccini, Giacomo Puccini's granddaughter. The subjects of the Puccinian heroines has been used by travel agency Kaleva Travel in Finland for its own year stamps. By 2012 nine stamps had been published and there were to come.

External links
 
 Viive Sterpu's web page (in Estonian)
 Mention of Viive Sterpu's death 

1953 births
2012 deaths
Artists from Tallinn
Estonian women painters
20th-century Estonian painters
21st-century Estonian painters
20th-century Estonian women artists
21st-century Estonian women artists